Human immunodeficiency virus salivary gland disease (abbreviated to HIV-SGD, and also termed HIV-associated salivary gland disease), is swelling of the salivary glands and/or xerostomia in individuals infected with human immunodeficiency virus.


Signs and symptoms
 Gradual enlargement of the major salivary glands, particularly the parotid glands. This swelling may be on one side or both sides, may cause disfigurement and may be painful.
 Xerostomia (dry mouth) with no other cause such as a side effect of medications.

HIV-SGD may be the presenting sign of HIV infection. There may also be xerophthalmia (dry eyes) and arthralgia (joint pain), similar to Sjögren syndrome.

Epidemiology
HIV-SGD is more prevalent in HIV positive children than HIV positive adults, at about 19% and 1% respectively. Unlike other oral manifestations of HIV/AIDS such as Kaposi sarcoma, oral hairy leukoplakia and oral candidiasis, which decreased following the introduction of highly active antiretroviral therapy (HAART), HIV-SGD has increased.

References

Salivary gland pathology
HIV/AIDS